Das Literarische Echo - The Bimonthly magazine for the friends of literature (Halbmonatschrift für Literaturfreunde) - was a German literary magazine.  Between its establishment in 1898 and 1923 it was published by Deutsche Verlags-Anstalt. Its managing editor from its inception till his death in 1912 was the literary historian Josef Ettlinger who was succeeded by Ernst Heilborn. In 1933, the year of Germany's régime change, Heilborn was succeeded by Wilhelm Emanuel Süskind. Many of the most important writers and literary critics in the German speaking countries of central Europe wrote for Das Literarische Echo during the years before the First World War.

The magazine underwent a name change in 1923, becoming known simply as Die Literatur. A further name change saw it published, between 1942 and 1944, under the title Europäische Literatur.

Contributors included:

 Otto Julius Bierbaum
 Richard Dehmel
 Paul Heyse
 Ricarda Huch
 Fritz Mauthner
 Friedrich Schrader
 Emile Verhaeren
 Georg Witkowski
 Ernst von Wolzogen
 Fedor von Zobeltitz
 Stefan Zweig

References

1898 establishments in Germany
1944 disestablishments in Germany
Bi-monthly magazines published in Germany
Defunct literary magazines published in Germany
German-language magazines
Magazines established in 1898
Magazines disestablished in 1944
Magazines published in Hamburg
Magazines published in Munich